The Goa Police Cup is an annual football tournament organized by the Sports Cell of Goa Police. The tournament is played between the top teams of Goa Professional League and GFA First Division League and sometimes an invitational team from India. Goa Police Cup is one of the oldest tournaments in Goa, starting since 1968. The competition is played in a group stage followed by knockout. Vasco won the inaugural edition. The current champions in 2022 edition are Sesa Football Academy.

Prize

The winner of the Goa Police Cup  get a cash prize of Rupees 2 lakh and the runners up get a cash prize of Rupees 1 lakh. The Goa Police Football Cup has a history of being one of the oldest football tournaments in the country with a 5-feet 5 inches silverware trophy, donated by Shantillal Gosalia, being awarded to the winners.

Teams

The following teams participated in 2016–17 Goa Police Cup.

Venues

The tournament was played at the following venues. Duler, Raia, Cuncolim and Ambelim.

Results

References

Football cup competitions in India
Football in Goa
1968 establishments in India
Recurring sporting events established in 1968